Ger Duany (born 1978 in Akobo, Greater Upper Nile in South Sudan) is an actor. He is a self-described “village boy”.

Early life 

Duany was born in Akobo (then part of Sudan) on November 9, 1978. He had his first experience of war at the age of seven. His family and community were uprooted. At age 13, war separated him from his mother, and he resorted to becoming a child soldier as a means of survival during South Sudan’s struggle for independence. Duany later became a refugee in Ethiopia and then Kenya, and was resettled to the United States from Dadaab camp at the age of 15.
 
Duany went on to earn a college degree. He built a career as an actor and fashion model.

Career
Duany made his debut as an actor in the 2004 philosophical comedy film I Heart Huckabees, in which he played a refugee called Stephen Nimieri. Duany was picked for the role because the film's producer and director David O. Russell wanted someone who had endured the real-life experience of being a refugee.

In 2010, Duany made an uncredited appearance in another Russell film, The Fighter, starring Mark Wahlberg and Christian Bale. He later had an important role in the 2011 drama Restless City.

In mid-2011, he co-produced and starred in the documentary Ger: To Be Separate, about his journey from war child to refugee to Hollywood actor and international model. The film also showed his return to South Sudan, voting for the first time and celebrating the country's newly acquired independence on 9 July 2011.

Duany played a limo driver in the 2012 film, Isn't It Delicious? by director Michael Patrick Kelly.

In 2014 he appeared alongside other refugees and award-winning Reese Witherspoon in The Good Lie, inspired by the story behind the Lost Boys of Sudan. The film tells the story of three refugees who are resettled from Kakuma camp to the United States, and their struggles to integrate.

As a model, Duany has appeared on the cover of numerous magazines such as Heed, Bleu Magazine, and Numéro.

During the 2015 World Refugee Day, Duany was announced as the UNHCR's Goodwill Ambassador for the East and Horn of Africa Region by the Kenya Country Representative, Raouf Mazou in Kakuma. Duany is currently one of the UNHCR's high profile supporters as its Goodwill Ambassador. In his role as UNHCR High Profile Supporter, he has helped to spread awareness about the plight of refugees and other populations that the UN refugee agency serves.

Filmography

References

External links
 
 United Nations High Commissioner for Refugees profile: http://www.unhcr.org/pages/556834296.html

1978 births
Living people
South Sudanese expatriates in the United States
South Sudanese actors
University of Bridgeport alumni
People from Bieh
American people of South Sudanese descent
South Sudanese refugees
Refugees in Ethiopia
Refugees in Kenya
South Sudanese models